Fabio Berardi (born 26 May 1959 in Borgo Maggiore, San Marino) is a Sammarinese politician.

He served as a Captain Regent of San Marino from April 2001 until October 2001 and from October 2016 to April 2017. From October 2001 until December 2003, he served as Secretary of State for Planning, Environment and Agriculture. From January 2004 until July 2006 he served as the minister of foreign and political affairs of San Marino until he was succeeded on 27 July by Fiorenzo Stolfi. From July 2006, he was minister of public health until September 2008. Since December 2008, he has served as Secretary of State for Tourism, Sports, Economic Planning and Relations.

Berardi was a member of the Sammarinese Socialist Party and its successor the Party of Socialists and Democrats until September 2008 when he and another member, Nadia Ottaviani, splintered off to form a new party, Arengo and Freedom, which he now leads.

References

1959 births
People from Borgo Maggiore
Arengo and Freedom politicians
Government ministers of San Marino
Captains Regent of San Marino
Members of the Grand and General Council
Living people
Party of Socialists and Democrats politicians
Secretaries of State for Foreign and Political Affairs of San Marino